Yannik Reuter (born 6 March 1991) is a Belgian former professional tennis player. He was active on tour from 2008 to 2018 and reached a best singles world ranking of 195.

Biography
A Sankt Vith-native, Reuter is a member of Belgium's German speaking community. 

Reuter competed in his first professional tournament in 2008 and won eight singles titles on the ITF Futures circuit during his career. He made two ATP Challenger finals, the first in Meknes in 2013. After making his grand slam qualifying debut at the 2016 US Open, he broke into the world's top 200 two months later by making the final of the Brest Challenger. En route to the final in Brest he upset world number 73 and top seed Jérémy Chardy, but finished runner-up to Norbert Gombos. In 2017 he was beaten by Frances Tiafoe in the second qualifying round of the Australian Open and also appeared in qualifiers for the French Open and Wimbledon that year. 

Following his retirement from the international tour in 2018, Reuter began studying at the University of Düsseldorf and as of 2022 is living in Cologne, Germany. He has competed in the local Bundesliga competition.

ATP Challenger/ITF Futures finals

Singles: 20 (8–12)

References

External links
 
 

1991 births
Living people
Belgian male tennis players
People from St. Vith
Sportspeople from Liège Province
Belgian expatriate sportspeople in Germany